The Hartley Mound is a Native American burial mound in Columbus, Ohio. The mound was created around 2,000 years ago by the Pre-Columbian Native American Adena culture. The site was added to the National Register of Historic Places in 1974. The mound measures 2 ft. high and 43 ft. in diameter. The site's location near a tributary to a major waterway, artifacts found nearby, and the small subconical form of the mound, suggests that it was built by the Adena culture (c. 500 B.C.  400 A.D.). It is one of few mounds not seriously disturbed by agriculture, industry, or illegal excavation. Upon archaeological excavation, the site should provide information on Adena burial customs and domestic or mortuary structures.

Resources about the site, including its National Register of Historic Places nomination, are restricted under the Archaeological Resources Protection Act of 1979.

See also
 National Register of Historic Places listings in Columbus, Ohio

References

External links
 

Adena culture
Archaeological sites in Ohio
Mounds in Ohio
History of Columbus, Ohio